This is a list of mangrove ecoregions ordered according to whether they lie in the Afrotropical, Australasian, Indomalayan, or Neotropical realms of the world. Mangrove estuaries such as those found in the Sundarbans of southwestern Bangladesh are rich productive ecosystems which serve as spawning grounds and nurseries for shrimp, crabs, and many fish species, a richness which is lost if the area is cleared and converted to ponds for shrimp farming or rice paddies.

Afrotropical

Australasian

Indomalayan

Nearctic

Neotropical

See also 
 Mangrove
 Ecoregion

Notes